The Alvis Speed 20 is a British touring car that was made between late 1931 and 1936 by Alvis Car and Engineering Company in Coventry. It went through four variants coded SA to SD.

In October 1935 the Speed 20 was supplemented by a 3½-litre car initially sold alongside their Speed 20 SD and named 3½-litre SA. After their Speed 20 was dropped from their catalogue the 3½-litre car was given a shorter wheelbase and named Speed 25 SB.

Speed 20 SA

The car could be fitted with a variety of coachwork. Standard bodies were a four-door sports saloon from coachbuilders Charlesworth, a four-seater sports coupé or four-door tourer by Cross & Ellis, but some cars were supplied in chassis form and carried bodies by coachbuilders such as Vanden Plas. The 4-speed gearbox had syncromesh on the top three gears and a "silent third". It used a single plate clutch, offside change lever, open tubular propellor shaft with metal joints (arranged in a straight line), and a spiral bevel fully floating back axle.

Approximately 400 of the SA cars were made.

Speed 20 SB
Steering was improved using new designs employed for racing Alvis cars since 1925. Road shocks were not transmitted from one wheel to the other nor did they affect the steering wheel and the gyroscopic effect was eliminated. Rear springs damped by Hartford Telecontrol dampers are long and underslung. The engine remained the same but the new all-silent gearbox, the first of its type, gained synchromesh on the bottom gear as well and was mounted separately from the engine. A built-in jacking system was fitted as standard.

As with the SA, a wide range of bodies were fitted to the cars. Large Lucas  P100 headlamps became standard, adding to the sporting appearance of the car.

Road test
The Times motoring correspondent tested and after describing its technical features in detail reviewed the car. Salient comments have been summarised as follows. 
The four-seater saloon was described as "distinctly fast in acceleration and speed" with a comfortable body such that a passer-by looks twice at it. A third person could be squeezed into the back seat. The four windows in the four doors allowed a good view all round. It was noted that each front wheel was independently steered and sprung in the manner introduced on the Alvis Crested Eagle and used on Alvis's racing cars since 1925, the aim being to provide good directional stability, road-holding and comfort.

The steering and suspension was a star feature, the steering action exceptionally steady and light. The car does not heel or roll and there is little wheel bounce. The best speeds on second and third gears were 48 and 68 mph, 90 mph should be possible in top. Providing on the road such rapid acceleration and high rates the engine ran fairly quietly and with smoothness yet displaying exuberant spirits. The action of clutch and new gear change was pleasing.

Speed 20 SC
Modifications were also made to the complex steering gear, and the front damping was improved. Twin electric fuel pumps were provided. At the rear the chassis was stiffened by having side members above and below the axle.

Speed 20 SD
The final SD version for 1936 was similar to the SC but had a larger fuel tank and slightly wider bodywork.  A  wheelbase version became an option.

3½-litre engine

As with many cars of the time, bodies were getting more luxurious and hence heavier. Five weeks after their 30 August 1935 announcement of minor improvements to their Speed 20 Alvis announced a new additional 3½-litre 26hp engine fed by triple SU carburettors naming it 3½-litre SA. Twelve months later given a strengthened engine with seven main bearings it was renamed Speed 25.

References

External links

 Alvis Cars Owners Club website

Speed 20
Cars introduced in 1932